Lourdes Pérez Iturraspe (born 16 February 2000) is an Argentinian field hockey goalkeeper.

Hockey career 
In 2018 she participated in 2018 Youth Olympic Games with her country field hockey team. She and her team won a gold medal in the competition.

In 2022 she participated in Under22 (originally U21) category of 2022 Women's FIH Hockey Junior World Cup (delayed one year). Her team was a defending champion and they lost to Germany in quarter-finals. She played 5 matches.

In June 2022, Pérez was called into the senior national women's team.

References

Argentine female field hockey players
Living people
2000 births
Field hockey players from Buenos Aires
21st-century Argentine women